Balaganj Union is a Union Parishad under Balaganj Upazila of Sylhet District in the division of Sylhet, Bangladesh. It has an area of  square kilometres and a population of 3. Muhammad Abdul Munim has been leading it since 2016. The chief police (dofadar) of the Union is Abdul Malik.

Chairmen

Markets
Balaganj Bazar, Ilashpur Bazar, Bualjur Bazar, Khalibari Bazar.

Villages
Tilock Chanpur, Mazlishpur, Dhaksin Mazlishpur, Adityapur, Gourinatpur, Rifatpur, Pir Pur, Chanpur, Jagatpur, Ilashpur, Noyapathon, Botpathon, Babrobpur, Hasampur, Ushanpur, Radhakuna, Siria, Rupia, Manan, Charshubia, Charharia, Charbutha, Rahmatpur, Khajipur, Khalibari, Madaripur, and Kasipur.

Institutions

Colleges
Balaganj Degree College is here. It is going to get the opportunity to be a governmental college soon. It was established in 1993 at Balaganj Union.

High schools
There are four High Schools in Balaganj Union. Name of the high schools are:
 Balaganj D N Model High School
 Toyrun Nessa Girls High School
 Bualjur Bazar High School
 Kaliganj M Ilias Ali High School

Balaganj D N Model High School had established on 1 April 1946.  Toyrun Nessa Girls High School had established in 1977,  Bualjur Bazar High School had established on 1 January 1973 and Kaliganj M Ilias Ali High School had established in 2001 respectively.

Madrashas
There is only a madrasah named Islamia Mohammadia Alim Madrasha. Founder: Mr. Abdul Hamid Mosru.

References

External links
 About Balaganj Union Parishad

Unions of Balaganj Upazila